Edwin Charles Reese (born July 23, 1941) is an American college and Olympic swimming coach, and a former college swimmer. Reese serves as the head coach of the Texas Longhorns men's swimming and diving team that represents the University of Texas in Austin, Texas. He previously served as the men's head coach for the United States' Olympic Swimming Team in 2004 and 2008, as well as an assistant coach at the 1992, 1996, 2000 and 2012 Summer Olympics. He is widely regarded as the greatest swim coach in history.

Early years 
Reese was born in Daytona Beach, Florida in 1941. He attended Mainland High School in Daytona Beach and swam for the Mainland Buccaneers high school swim team, winning two state high school championships in the 200-yard individual medley swimming event.

He then enrolled in the University of Florida in Gainesville, Florida, where he swam for coach Buddy Crone and coach Bill Harlan's Florida Gators swimming and diving teams, leading the Gators to three consecutive Southeastern Conference (SEC) team championships (1961, 1962, 1963). As the team's senior co-captain, Reese became the first Florida swimmer to win five SEC individual titles in a single season — the 200-yard breaststroke, the 200-yard and 400-yard individual medleys, the 400-yard freestyle relay and the 400-yard medley relay.

Reese graduated from the University of Florida with a bachelor's degree in physical education in 1963.

Coaching career 

After Reese graduated from Florida, he remained in Gainesville as a graduate assistant coach and earned his master's degree from Florida in 1965. Reese then coached and taught at Roswell High School in Roswell, New Mexico for one year (1965–1966), before returning to the University of Florida as an assistant coach for six seasons (1967–1972).

Reese became the head coach of the Auburn Tigers swim team at Auburn University in Auburn, Alabama in 1972, leading the Tigers for six seasons (1973–1978). The Tigers were a team that had not qualified a single swimmer for the finals or consolation finals of the SEC championship meet during the previous season. After six seasons, Auburn had produced four consecutive top-ten showings at the NCAA championships, and in his final season at Auburn, the Tigers placed second in the SEC and NCAA championships, the highest finish in program history to that time.

In 1978, Reese accepted the head coaching position for the Texas Longhorns men's swimming and diving team of the University of Texas in Austin, Texas. Since that time, his Longhorns team have won 15 National Collegiate Athletic Association (NCAA) team championships (1981, 1988, 1989, 1990, 1991, 1996, 2000, 2001, 2002, 2010, 2015, 2016, 2017, 2018, 2021), and he has been named CSCAA Coach of the Year eight times. Starting with his second year at Texas, his teams have won the conference championship every season (42 in a row as of 2021). Reese has coached numerous current and former world record holders. Some of his notable swimmers include Ian Crocker, Rick Carey, Brendan Hansen, Neil Walker, Ricky Berens, Josh Davis, Dave Walters, Garrett Weber-Gale, Eric Shanteau, Scott Spann, Aaron Peirsol, Jack Conger, Clark Smith, Townley Haas, Will Licon, Joseph Schooling, Drew Kibler, Caspar Corbeau, and Carson Foster.

Honors and awards 
Reese was inducted into the University of Florida Athletic Hall of Fame as a "Gator Great" in 1988, and the International Swimming Hall of Fame (ISHOF) as an "Honor Coach" in 2002.  His brother, Randy Reese, who is also a university and Olympic swimming coach, was inducted in 2005.  Reese is also a member of the Longhorn Hall of Honor.

See also 
 Auburn Tigers
 Florida Gators
 List of University of Florida alumni
 List of University of Florida Athletic Hall of Fame members
 List of University of Florida Olympians
 Texas Longhorns

References

External links 

 Eddie Reese – University of Texas coach profile at TexasSports.com
 Eddie Reese (USA) – Honor Coach profile at International Swimming Hall of Fame
 Floswimming Video Interviews with Eddie Reese

1941 births
Living people
American Olympic coaches
American male breaststroke swimmers
American male freestyle swimmers
American male medley swimmers
American swimming coaches
Auburn Tigers swimming coaches
Florida Gators men's swimmers
Florida Gators swimming coaches
Sportspeople from Daytona Beach, Florida
Texas Longhorns swimming coaches
20th-century American people